Qarah Tappeh (also Romanized as Qareh Tappeh) is a village in Mahmudabad Rural District, in the Central District of Shahin Dezh County, West Azerbaijan Province, Iran. At the 2006 census, its population was 531, in 137 families.

References 

Populated places in Shahin Dezh County